Platylesches rasta is a butterfly in the family Hesperiidae. It is found in Uganda, Tanzania and Malawi.

Subspecies
Platylesches rasta rasta (north-eastern Tanzania, Malawi)
Platylesches rasta anka Evans, 1937 (Uganda)

References

Butterflies described in 1937
Erionotini